The Sinai fan-fingered gecko (Ptyodactylus guttatus) is a species of gecko. It is found in Egypt and the Middle East.

References

Ptyodactylus
Reptiles described in 1827
Taxa named by Carl von Heyden